Debra Martin Chase (born October 11, 1956) is an American motion picture and television producer. Her company, Martin Chase Productions, is affiliated with Universal Television, a division of NBCUniversal Television Group. It was affiliated with the Walt Disney Company from 2001 to 2016. She is the first African-American female producer to have a deal at a major studio.

Background
Chase was born in Great Lakes, Illinois, but moved with her family as a child to Pasadena, California.  She earned her B.A. from Mount Holyoke College in 1977 and J.D. from Harvard Law School in 1981.

In an interview with Essence magazine in 1997, she told journalist Audrey Edwards, "I'm the kid who was in the movie theater every Saturday." Debra adds, "I've been a movie fanatic since I was a child, and my images of the world were shaped by what I saw on the screen. I want to do my part to see that Blacks are not only represented in film but also enhance it."

About first starting out, Chase has said, “I didn’t know the mechanics of how things worked. So I read books, went to seminars, met with anybody who’d meet with me just to learn information.” Chase met with the general counsel at Columbia Pictures production company through a good friend’s sister. Later she met with and became the executive assistant to Frank Price, chairman of Columbia Pictures.  Chase worked with Price for a year. After Sony brought Mark Canton in for the top job and Price gained a spot for Chase on the creative staff, before he left the company.(Alexander, George)

Among her favorite directors are Carl Franklin, Steven Soderbergh, and Martin Scorsese. Chase works to express positive messages through her TV and films. "It's immensely rewarding to know that you are having a huge impact on the self-image, values and life perspective of kids," she contends.

In an interview with George Alexander, Chase offered advice for aspiring producers, encouraging those who are interested in a film career too.

Career
Chase practiced law throughout the 1980s, eventually moving to the film industry when she joined the legal department at Columbia Studios. She ran Denzel Washington's Mundy Lane Entertainment from 1992 to 1995 and Whitney Houston's Brown House Productions from 1995 to 2000. She formed her own company, Martin Chase Productions, in 2000, in California.

In 1981, Chase took an entry-level associate job with a law firm in Houston. She realized that law was not the career that she wanted. "I hated every minute practicing law," she admitted to Essence in 2003. In the 1980s, she worked as a legal consultant, a freelance writer, and for the 1988 presidential campaign of Michael Dukakis, nominee of the Democratic Party.

In the late 1980s, Chase became involved with the film business and left Houston for Columbia Pictures in Los Angeles, California. She was selected for a spot in its executive-training program. Chase was later promoted to become an executive assistant to Frank Price, the top executive with the studio.

After she worked up the courage to speak to actor Denzel Washington at Columbia studios, he suggested they set up a meeting. Later, Washington hired Chase to run his production company, Mundy Lane Entertainment, where she stayed from 1992-1995. She worked with Washington to executive produce Hank Aaron: Chasing the Dream, a two-hour documentary on the baseball legend, which aired on the TBS Superstation in April 1995. The film was nominated for an Academy Award and an Emmy. It won a Peabody Award, the Crystal Heart Award from the Heartland Film Festival, and was voted Best Documentary by the National Association of Minorities in Cable.

Chase was one of the executive producers of Rodgers & Hammerstein’s Cinderella, which aired in November 1997 on ABC’s The Wonderful World of Disney and stars Brandy, Whitney Houston and Whoopi Goldberg. The television musical was watched by more than 60 million viewers. It was nominated for seven Emmys and won the Emmy in the category of Art Production.

In 2001, partnering with Disney, Chase produced a movie hit with The Princess Diaries. Starring Julie Andrews and Anne Hathaway, the movie grossed more than $108 million in domestic box office receipts and sold over 17 million video and DVD units. She also produced The Princess Diaries 2: Royal Engagement. Her work with Princess Diaries was designed to make "Every girl, and the girl in every woman, [wish] that she would wake up one day and find out that she’s a princess." (Alexander, 497) Chase inspires young girls to believe they have the power to do what they want to do.

In the summer of 2005, Chase produced a movie for Alcon Entertainment and Warner Bros. titled The Sisterhood of the Traveling Pants, based on the book by Ann Brashares, starring America Ferrera, Blake Lively, Amber Tamblyn, and Alexis Bledel. Her company, Martin Chase Productions, has been an affiliate of the Walt Disney Company for more than 11 years, and she recently signed an overall deal with ABC Studios.

Chase was the executive producer of The Cheetah Girls, a movie/musical franchise on Disney Channel. Based on a best-selling book by Deborah Gregory, it stars Raven-Symoné, Sabrina Bryan, Adrienne Bailon, Kiely Williams, and Lynn Whitfield. A second installment of the movie, The Cheetah Girls 2, was shot in Barcelona, Spain. It premiered in August 2006 and was the most watched movie of the Disney network. The third installment debuted on The Disney Channel was The Cheetah Girls: One World, shot entirely in Udaipur, India, and premiered in August 2008. The soundtrack for the first movie went double platinum.

Chase co-created and produced, Byou, a teen workout DVD that is a dance fitness program for girls, combining pop and hip-hop movement. Starring Sabrina Bryan from The Cheetah Girls franchise, the DVD is geared toward young girls. More than a quarter million DVDs were sold.

Chase produced Just Wright, starring Queen Latifah and Common, which was the winner of the 2011 NAACP Image Award for Best Screenplay and the recipient of four Image Award nominations, including Best Picture.

Chase was the executive producer of the Disney Channel musical Lemonade Mouth, which debuted as the most-watched cable movie of 2011.  Its soundtrack, which she also executive produced, became the number four album in the U.S. in its second week of release and the number one soundtrack for several weeks.

Chase produced Sparkle, a remake of the 1976 classic musical. The film, released August 2012, stars Whitney Houston.  In an interview with Collider, Chase comments on Sparkle's musical aspect, "'We’re in a period which is the renaissance of the musical.' Chase adds, "You’ve got incredible songs. You have good stories.  You’ve kind of got the whole ball of wax.  So we are glad to be a part of it."

Chase produced Lovestruck, the first musical for ABC Family, which stars Jane Seymour, Chelsea Kane and Sara Paxton. She also produced McKenna Shoots For The Stars, a film for the American Girl company, which debuted on NBC July 2012.

In television, Chase produced the romantic sitcom Zoe Ever After, which stars Grammy Award-winning musician and actress Brandy Norwood. The show premiered on BET in January 2016. It has recently been picked up for a second season.

Chase volunteers for a number of organizations and is a "producing mentor" for the University of Southern California. She has served on the board of directors of the United Friends of Children; the Women at NBCUniversal Advisory Board; and the advisory board of Columbia College of Chicago. Currently, she serves on the Board of Trustees of Mount Holyoke College; the New York City Ballet; and the Second Stage Theatre. Chase is also a member of the Academy of Television Arts and Sciences.

She currently executive produces The Equalizer TV series starring Queen Latifah, which has been renewed for seasons three and four by CBS and Universal Television. It premiered right after Super Bowl 2021 and was the #1 rated new television series in its first season. Her most recent film is HARRIET, based upon the life of the iconic Underground Railroad conductor and spy, Harriet Tubman.  Directed by Kasi Lemmons from a script by Lemmons and Gregory Alan Howard, the film stars Tony Award winners Cynthia Erivo and Leslie Odom, Jr. along with Joe Alwyn and Janelle Monae. The film hit theaters nationwide in November 2019 to critical acclaim, and numerous award nominations including Academy Award nominations for Best Actress for Erivo and for Best Song.   
In 2022 Chase co-produced, in partnership with Marc Platt, the Broadway production of the Pulitzer Prize winning musical A STRANGE LOOP which won Tony Awards for Best Musical and Best Book. She is currently producing the Broadway revival of the Pulitzer Prize winning play Suzan-Lori Parks’ TOPDOG/UNDERDOG which stars Tony nominee Corey Hawkins and Emmy winner Yahya Abdul-Mateen II and is directed by Tony winner Kenny Leon. It will open in the fall of 2022.

Personal life
Chase was raised Catholic, stopped practicing as an adolescent, and later was married in the Church. She began attending Mass again some years later, identifying as Catholic in 2005.

Chase is an honorary member of Alpha Kappa Alpha Sorority, Inc.

Honors
Chase has been honored by:

 May 2007 --  Ebony magazine:  Television and Film Award for Outstanding Women in Marketing and Communications
 2007, 2008 & 2009 -- Ebony Magazine:  one of the 150 Most Influential African Americans in America 
 October 2003: Essence magazine - 50 African American women shaping the world
 February 2011: Athena Film Festival - Exceptional Success as a Motion Picture and Television Producer
 December 2012 -- Black Enterprise Magazine—one of the Ten Most Bankable African American Movie Producers in Hollywood based on worldwide box office 
 2013 -- The Trumpet Awards Foundation—awarded The Entertainment Award 
 2015 -- The African American Film Critics Association—awarded The Ashley Boone Award

Producer credits
She was a producer in all films unless otherwise noted.

Film

Television

Theater

Further reading
 Brashares, Ann. The Sisterhood of the Traveling Pants. Dell Books. May 23, 2006 
 Cabot, Meg (2001). The Princess Diaries. New York, New York. HarperTrophy. .
 George, Alexander. Why We Make Moves: Black Filmmakers Talk About the Magic of Cinema. Harlem Moon. 2003

Notes

References

External links
 
 Biography at The HistoryMakers
 Chasing Hollywood - Mount Holyoke College
 "For 'Princess' producer, movie dreams really do come true" - USA Today
 Hollywood Hit Maker

1956 births
Living people
African-American film producers
Film producers from Illinois
African-American women lawyers
African-American lawyers
Harvard Law School alumni
Mount Holyoke College alumni
People from Pasadena, California
Television producers from California
American women television producers
Film producers from California
Entertainment lawyers
20th-century American lawyers
People from Great Lakes, Illinois
Television producers from Illinois
American women film producers
20th-century American women lawyers
African-American Catholics
20th-century African-American women
20th-century African-American people
21st-century African-American people
21st-century African-American women
African-American television producers